Jodie Turner-Smith (born 7 September 1986) is a British actress and model. She made her feature film debut in The Neon Demon (2016) and has since acted in Queen & Slim (2019), After Yang (2022), and White Noise (2022). She's also known for her television roles in the TNT series The Last Ship (2017), and the Syfy series Nightflyers (2018). She portrayed the title role in the Channel 5 series Anne Boleyn. (2021).

 Early life 
Turner-Smith was born in Peterborough, England to Jamaican parents; she is the only one of her siblings who was not born in Jamaica. She resided in Peterborough until she was 10 years old. After her parents divorced she immigrated to the United States with her mother, brother and half-sister, residing in Gaithersburg, Maryland. Turner-Smith studied finance at the University of Pittsburgh; she graduated in 2008 and subsequently worked at a bank. She has lived in Los Angeles since 2009.

 Career 
In 2009, a mutual friend introduced Turner-Smith to musician Pharrell Williams after a N.E.R.D. concert. When she told him she was looking to become a writer, he convinced her to become a model and move to Los Angeles.

She made her acting debut in 2013 as a siren in True Blood, which led to numerous minor roles in films and music videos between 2013 and 2017. During this time, she was credited as Jodie Smith. In 2016, she appeared in the music video for Zayn Malik's "Pillowtalk."

Turner-Smith first came to prominence playing Sgt. Azima Kandie in the 2017–2018 season of the TNT series The Last Ship. She had a major role as Melantha Jhirl in the 2018 Syfy/Netflix series Nightflyers.

She starred as Josie in the Cinemax series Jett, which premiered in June 2019, and portrayed the role of Queen in the 2019 thought provoking drama film Queen & Slim, opposite Daniel Kaluuya.

In October 2020, it was announced that Turner-Smith would be portraying Queen Anne Boleyn in Anne Boleyn, a three-part drama series on Channel 5, which details the final months of Boleyn's life. Her casting was met with backlash due to her race. The series premiered in May 2021. Turner-Smith received praise for her performance, however critics were less complimentary about the series' writing and plot. Audience reactions were mixed.

In January 2021, it was announced that she was cast as Éile, a warrior blessed with the voice of a goddess, in The Witcher: Blood Origin, a six-episode limited series prequel to The Witcher. In April 2021, Netflix announced that she had departed the project due to scheduling conflicts and a change in the production schedule.

Turner-Smith starred in Kogonada’s sci-fi drama After Yang alongside Colin Farrell. The film was released in March, 2022. She joined upcoming Star Wars spin off The Acolyte''

Personal life 
Turner-Smith began a relationship with actor Joshua Jackson in October 2018. They married in December 2019 and their daughter was born in April 2020.

In 2019, Turner-Smith expressed ambivalence about becoming an American citizen but said she would consider doing so.

Filmography

Film

Television

Short

Music video

Notes

References

External links 

 
 
 

1986 births
Actresses from Cambridgeshire
American actors of Jamaican descent
Black British actresses
British people of Jamaican descent
English emigrants to the United States
Female models from Maryland
Female models from California
Living people
People from Peterborough
People from Los Angeles
People from Gaithersburg, Maryland
University of Pittsburgh alumni
Gaithersburg High School alumni
21st-century American women